Joseph McMain (26 December 1872 – 1957) was an English footballer who played in the Football League for Notts County and Wolverhampton Wanderers.

References

1872 births
1957 deaths
English footballers
Association football forwards
English Football League players
South Shore F.C. players
Preston North End F.C. players
Kettering Town F.C. players
Wolverhampton Wanderers F.C. players
Notts County F.C. players
Wednesbury Old Athletic F.C. players